The Watchman is a 1996 album by cellist Erik Friedlander which was released on the Tzadik label.

Reception

The Allmusic review by Stacia Proefrock awarded the album 3 stars stating "Friedlander has made a name for himself in the past by playing jazz cello with a style that does more than just mimic the high registers of a standup bass, and on this album he is freed even more from the expectations of the jazz tradition to create beautiful music with spiritual depth and a warm, sensual tone. The album's thematic exploration of emotion, memory, and mourning only add depth to the compositions".

Track listing
All compositions by Erik Friedlander
 "The Watchman" - 1:36   
 "Elisha (She Bears - Healing the Child - Parting the Waters)" - 12:25   
 "The Silver Bracelet: Theme" - 1:23   
 "Najime" - 9:07   
 "The Silver Bracelet" - 11:58   
 "Variations on the Watchman (Swords - The Trumpet Sounds - Night - Blood - Morning)" - 3:01   
 "Silver Like Dust" - 4:41   
 "The Watchman (Sleeps)" - 1:43

Personnel
Erik Friedlander – cello
Chris Speed - clarinet
Andrew D'Angelo - bass clarinet 
Drew Gress - bass

References 

1996 albums
Erik Friedlander albums
Tzadik Records albums